The House of Balliol (de Bailleul) was a noble family originating from the village of Bailleul in Picardy.  They held estates in England, granted during the reign of King William Rufus.  Through marriage, they had claims to the Throne of Scotland.  One member of the family, John Balliol, was named King of Scotland after the disputed succession following extinction of the Dunkeld line.  John was deposed, leading to the First War of Scottish Independence.  His son, Edward Balliol, also briefly controlled the Scottish throne during the Second War of Scottish Independence.  Edward had no issue, and the direct line went extinct with him.

List of heads of the Balliol estates
 Guy I de Balliol (died before 1130 × 1133), established lordship in northern England in 1090s
 Bernard I de Balliol (died 1154 x 1162), nephew of Guy
 Guy II de Balliol (died early 1160s x 1167), son of Bernard
 Bernard II de Balliol (died c. 1190), brother of above
 Eustace de Balliol (died c. 1209), cousin of above
 Hugh de Balliol (died 1229), son of above
 John I de Balliol (died 1268), son of above, the founder of Balliol College
 John II de Balliol (died 1314), son of above, reigned as King of Scotland from 1292 to 1296, as a descendent David I of Scotland of the House of Dunkeld.
 Edward de Balliol (died 1364), eldest son of John; from 1332 to 1356 he was a pretender to the Scottish throne with the support of the England, in opposition to David II of Scotland.

The last two on the list both had English support for their claims but both were deposed. Edward died without issue, but the Balliol descent continued through his cousin Christine de Lindsay (granddaughter of John I), who married Enguerrand V, Lord of Coucy, to the lords of Coucy and ultimately the Bourbon kings of France and Spain.

See also
List of British monarchs
Scottish monarchs family tree
Château de Bailleul, the former family seat in France
Scott (surname)

References

 Stell, G. P., "Balliol, Bernard de (d. 1154x62)", Oxford Dictionary of National Biography, Oxford University Press, 2004 , accessed 24 Jan 2008
 Stell, G. P., "Balliol, Bernard de (d. c.1190)", Oxford Dictionary of National Biography, Oxford University Press, 2004 , accessed 24 Jan 2008
 Stell, G. P., "Balliol , John de (b. before 1208, d. 1268)", Oxford Dictionary of National Biography, Oxford University Press, 2004 , accessed 24 Jan 2008

 
People from Picardy
Balliol
Balliol
Scoto-Normans